Narbuta Bek was the Khan of Kokand from .  He was the grandson of Abdul Karim Bek his only successor of not killed by Irdana Bek in a coup for power.  He had three sons: Alim, Umar, and Shahrukh.  His son Alim succeeded him as khan until he was overthrown by Umar.

Rise to Power 
When Irdana Khan died in 1764, Sulayman Bek took over but only reigned or a few months, followed by Shahrukh Bek, after which Narbuta was handed power at the age of 14.  Records indicate that Narbuta long refused to accept power but eventually caved in to pressure from nobility and representatives of Kokand.

Domestic Policy 
Under the reign of Narbuta there was substantial immigration to Kokand due to the economic stability and prosperity in the Khanate.  Falus (copper coins) of the smallest denomination issued in Kokand were used during his reign.  No internal uprisings occurred against the Khanate.

Foreign Policy 
Narbuta attempted to conquer and annex Tashkent on multiple occasions but failed, but was able to conquer the cities of Andijan, Namangan, Ush, and Margilan.  Khujand changed hands several times between Kokand and other empires but was never fully annexed to Kokand. Diplomatic relations were also maintained with the Qing dynasty from the year 1774 until his death, with the Chinese recognizing him as Khan; the Khanate saw itself competing with the Emirate of Bukhara except when trying to annex Ura-Tepé.  When the armies of Kokand and Bukhara attempted to takeover Ura-Tepé from Khudayar Bek some 20,000 of their men were killed and their heads stacked into pyramids. Relations with the Qing suffered when the contraband trade in Fergana led to the Qing imposing sanctions on Kokandian merchants.

On his last expedition to Tashkent wherein he attempted to annex the city he was captured by the army of Yunnus Hodja and beheaded.

References

1749 births
1801 deaths
Khans of Kokand
18th-century monarchs in Asia
People from Kokand